Syed Jawad Naqvi (born 1952) is a Pakistani philosopher, scholar, Religious Leader, Quranic interpreter and theologian of Twelver Shia.

Early life and family details
He was born on 5 March 1952 in a village named Thipra Syedan, of Haripur District, of Khyber Pakhtunkwa, Pakistan.

Career
He has studied Islam in Iran for more than three decades. His most prominent teacher was Abdollah Javadi-Amoli. Naqvi is the principal of Jamia Urwa-tul-Wusqa and Jamia Jaffria, seminaries in Lahore and Gujranwala respectively. He is also the principal of Jamia Ummul Kitaab in Lahore, head of Deen-ul-Qayyim Online Islamic school and Siraat Education School System. Naqvi is also the editor of the monthly magazine Masharab-e-Naab. He is a staunch supporter of the Islamic Revolution of Iran. In many of his speeches he propagates the hard-line version of Wilayat-e-Fiqh. He stands for unity of sects in Pakistan under his banner.

Allegations and controversies 
In a 2012 report by Hudson Institute, he has been described as pro-Iran and to be financially supported by Iran. Alex Vatanka writes in an article titled "The Guardian of Pakistan's Shia" published by Hudson Institute, a strategic think-tank based in Washington. It says:
"Accordingly, many of Pakistan’s Shia religious figures have become highly vocal and partisan supporters of Khamenei. For example, Syed Jawad Naqvi, a prominent activist preacher and the head of a recently-launched Shia seminary in Pakistan, idealizes the theocracy in the Islamic Republic of Iran and calls himself a devoted follower of Khamenei. He has additionally published articles as well as a book denouncing Iran’s anti-clerical Green opposition movement.27 Not surprisingly, Naqvi’s seminary was reportedly established in part with financial support from the Iranian state."

In 2019, an article in The News described him of having "uniquely Iran-centered career".

However, Syed Jawad Naqvi has denied that he has received any support from Iran. In the opening ceremony of Jamia Urwatu Wusqa he said that this project is fully supported by local pakistani people. He said that none of his projects is supported by Iran or any other country and not a single penny has been received from outside Pakistan.

As recent as January 2020, he has been described as "a major supporter of Iran’s theocracy" by Foreign Policy, an American news publication.

In 2013, Mohammadi Masjid stopped Naqvi’s sermons after there was scuffle occurred when Police prevented Naqvi's security from entering the mosque, sparking mass protests outside the mosque. Allegedly his security guard was carrying unlicensed weapon. Police accused students of Naqvi, for creating the chaos and roughing up the cameraman, the varsity condemned the irresponsible behavior of the police. Subsequently, Naqvi was banned by Punjab Chief Minister Shahbaz Sharif from lecturing at Mohammadi Masjid in Lahore.

Views on Iran's System

Naqvi believes that Iran's system is based on Quran. This is against the opinion of major Shia clerics of Iran. In April 2018, Ayatollah Javadi Amoli said:

"The Qur'an calls Satan arrogant, but as far as I recall he has not been addressed as warrior against God in the Qur'an.  Interest system of our banks is a war against Allah and His Messenger (PBUH). You may name a year as a year of production and prosperity (the Iranian leader named the previous year the Year of Resistant Economy: Production and Employment), as long as there is interest on loan in banking system, nothing will improve."

Earlier on december 2016, Javadi Amoli said, Bank of Iran sucks blood of the people.

Views on Azadari of Muharram 
In 2020, after his alleged comparison of Azadari with Tarawih during a lecture, Indian daily and weekly Urdu newspapers Sahafat and Nauroz published articles critical to him.

 Indian daily and Urdu newspaper Sahafat and Hindi newspaper Bhumitra again criticised his May 29, 2020 Friday sermon, for targeting Indian Shia leadership.

In July 2020 Jawad Naqvi criticised Imamia Students Organisation for not being the pride of Guardianship of the Islamic Jurist which sparked a reaction and a resolution by Imamia Students Organization against him.

Views on women's roles 
According to academic scholar Wendy Qian, Syed Jawad Naqvi holds over all socially conservative views about women's roles. Qian says, Naqvi's views on women seems to have been influenced by South Asian conservative Islamic advise literature, and overall he reiterates same views with only addition that he expects women's roles in his idealistic Islamic political revolution in Pakistan, on which he has written a book The Role of Women towards the System of Wilayat.
In 2019, Naqvi termed Aurat March Organisers 'Most Evil Of All Women'.

Works

Books

Naqvi has written many books on the Quran, Pan Islamic Unity, Karbala and Islam including:

See also
Mazhar Ali Azhar

References

External links
 Lectures & speeches of Agha Syed Jawad Naqvi
 Videos of several prominent Shia scholars (& a Hindu Swami) from India & Pakistan criticising/refuting Jawad Naqvi, after his alleged comparison of Majlis with Tarawih during a lecture in 2020,

Shia scholars of Islam
Pakistani Shia Muslims
Shia fiqh
Pakistani Shia clerics
Living people
1952 births